In Australia, a lieutenant-governor is a standing appointment for a deputy governor of a state, who acts in place of the governor if the governor is unable, unavailable or unwilling to act. 

Constitutionally, Australian state lieutenant-governors, administrators and chief justices of state supreme courts are normally separate offices. However, in many states, such as New South Wales, the Chief Justice of the Supreme Court is also the lieutenant-governor. In 2001, the Constitution of Queensland was amended to restore the office of lieutenant-governor in that state. When a state governor dies, resigns, or is absent, an administrator or acting governor would be appointed. The state lieutenant-governors/administrators have no standing powers but stand ready to take up the governor's role. 

In some states, there is also a standing deputy governor, who can exercise only the powers which the governor delegates to him or her.

New South Wales
In New South Wales, there is a lieutenant-governor and an administrator, who takes up the duties of the Governor if the governor dies, resigns, or is absent.

Since 1872 the office was permanently filled by the Chief Justice of New South Wales but the position may be retained by the chief justice after his/her retirement from the Supreme Court of New South Wales. 

If the lieutenant-governor becomes incapacitated while serving in the office of governor, the next most senior judge of the Supreme Court is sworn in as administrator. 

The lieutenant-governors/administrators have no standing powers but stand ready to act in the governor's position.

Tom Bathurst, Chief Justice of the Supreme Court of New South Wales, is the current lieutenant governor.

South Australia
In South Australia, the lieutenant governor is appointed by the Governor at the governor's pleasure. The lieutenant governor acts as the vice-regal representative in the governor's absence.

The lieutenant governor may act as administrator of the state at the request of the premier if the governor is on extended leave or the office is vacant. If the lieutenant governor is not available, the chief justice is next in line to be appointed.

Brenda Wilson, CEO of the Cancer Council SA, is the current lieutenant governor.

Victoria
In Victoria, there is a lieutenant-governor and an administrator. The Chief Justice of Victoria is ex officio the administrator, unless the chief justice is the lieutenant-governor, in which case, the next most senior judge is the administrator. The lieutenant-governor takes on the responsibilities of the governor when that post is vacant or when the governor is out of the State or unable to act. The administrator takes on those duties if both the governor and lieutenant-governor are not able to act for the above reasons.

The lieutenant-governor is appointed by the governor on the advice of the Premier of Victoria. Appointment as lieutenant-governor of itself confers no powers or functions. If there is no governor or if the governor is unavailable to act for a substantial period, the lieutenant-governor assumes office as administrator and exercises all the powers and functions of a governor. If expecting to be unavailable for a short period only, the governor with the consent of the premier, usually commissions the lieutenant-governor to act as deputy governor, performing some or all of the powers and functions of the governor.

Ken Lay, former Chief Commissioner of Victoria Police and police officer, is the current lieutenant-governor.

Commonwealth
At the time of 28 March 2014, the Commonwealth deputies of the Governor-General were DameMarie Bashir AD CVO and Alex Chernov AC QC.
Further deputies are appointed to exercise narrow powers, such as convening executive meetings, opening parliament and swearing in new politicians. There is no lieutenant-governor. 

State governors hold a dormant commission to act as Administrator of the Commonwealth should the governor-general die, resign, or be absent overseas or on leave. By convention, the longest-serving state governor acts as administrator. 

Presently, the longest-serving state governor is Linda Dessau, who has been Governor of Victoria since 1 July 2015.

On 1 August 2015, Paul de Jersey held the office as administrator of the Government of the Commonwealth of Australia.

History
Historically, a lieutenant-governor could also be the deputy of the New South Wales governor in a particular territory. In the early and mid-19th century, lieutenant-governors ran Australasian sub-colonies that were initially subordinate to the colony of New South Wales, such as Van Diemen's Land (Tasmania), Victoria and the Bay of Islands (New Zealand).

References  

Australian constitutional law